Gagauzia or Gagauz-Yeri, officially the Autonomous Territorial Unit of Gagauzia (ATUG), is an autonomous territorial unit of Moldova. Its autonomy is ethnically motivated by the predominance in the region of the Gagauz people, who are primarily Orthodox Turkic-speaking people.

At the end of World War I, all of the territory of Gagauzia became part of the Kingdom of Romania, before being carved up into the Soviet Union in June 1940. From 1941 to 1944 it was again part of Romania, after which it was incorporated into the Moldavian Soviet Socialist Republic. As the Soviet Union began to disintegrate, Gagauzia declared independence in 1990 as the Gagauz Republic, but was integrated into Moldova in 1994.

Gagauz Yeri literally means "place of the Gagauz".

History 

The origin of the Gagauz is obscure. In the beginning of the 20th century, Bulgarian historian M. Dimitrov counted 19 different theories about their origin. A few decades later, the Gagauz ethnologist M. N. Guboglo increased that number to 21. In some of those theories the Gagauz are presented as descendants of the Bulgars, the Cumans-Kipchaks, or a clan of Seljuk Turks led by a Turkoman dervish, Sarı Saltık. The fact that their confession is Eastern Orthodox Christianity may suggest that their ancestors already lived in the Balkans prior to the Ottoman conquest in the late 14th century. Another theory indicates that Gagauz are descendants of Kutrigurs. In the official Gagauz museum, a plaque mentions that one of the two main theories is that they descend from the Bulgars.

Russian Empire
In 1812, Bessarabia, previously the eastern half of the Principality of Moldavia, was annexed by the Russian Empire following the defeat of the Ottoman Empire in the Russo-Turkish War of 1806–1812 (see Treaty of Bucharest (1812)). Nogai tribes who inhabited several villages in south Bessarabia (or Budjak) were forced to leave. Between 1812 and 1846, the Russians relocated the Gagauz people from what is today eastern Bulgaria (which was then under the Ottoman Empire) to the orthodox Bessarabia, mainly in the settlements vacated by the Nogai tribes. They settled there together with Bessarabian Bulgarians in Avdarma, Comrat, Congaz, Tomai, Cișmichioi, and other former Nogai villages. Some Gagauz were also settled in the part of the Principality of Moldavia that did not come under Russian control in 1812. But, within several years, villagers moved to live with their own people in the compact area in the south of Bessarabia where their descendants inhabit in the 21st century.

With the exception of a six-day de facto independence in the winter of 1906, when a peasant uprising declared an autonomous Comrat Republic, ethnic Gagauz have always been ruled by other dominant groups: the Russian Empire (1812–1917), the Kingdom of Romania (1918–1940 and 1941–1944), the Soviet Union (1940–1941 and 1944–1991), and Moldova (1917–1918 and 1991 to date).

Soviet Union
Gagauz nationalism remained an intellectual movement during the 1980s, but strengthened by the end of the decade, as the Soviet Union began to embrace liberal ideals. In 1988, activists from the local intelligentsia aligned with other ethnic minorities to create a movement known as the Gagauz People. A year later, the Gagauz People held its first assembly; they passed a resolution demanding the creation of an autonomous territory in southern Moldova, with the city of Comrat as its capital.

The Gagauz national movement intensified when Moldovan (Romanian) was accepted as the official language of the Republic of Moldova in August 1989, challenging the then-dominant Russian language which was the official language of the USSR. A part of the multiethnic population of southern Moldova was concerned about the change in official languages. They had a lack of confidence in the central government in Chișinău. The Gagauz were also worried about the implications for them if Moldova reunited with Romania, as seemed likely at the time. In August 1990, Comrat declared itself an autonomous republic, but the Moldovan government annulled the declaration as unconstitutional. At that time, Stepan Topal emerged as the leader of the Gagauz national movement.

Independent Moldova

Support for the Soviet Union remained high in Gagauzia, with a referendum in March 1991 returning an almost unanimous vote in favour of remaining part of the USSR. Many Gagauz supported the Moscow coup attempt in August 1991, and Gagauzia declared itself an independent republic on 19 August 1991. In September Transnistria declared its independence, thus further straining relations with the government of Moldova. But, when the Moldovan parliament voted on independence on 27 August 1991, six of the 12 Gagauz deputies in the Moldovan parliament voted in favour, while the other six abstained. The Moldovan government began to pay more attention to minority rights. The economic dependence of Gagauzia on the rest of Moldova, and the Moldovan army's inability to defeat Transnistria, created reasons for compromise on both sides.

In February 1994, President Mircea Snegur promised autonomy to the Gagauz, but opposed independence. He was also opposed to the suggestion that Moldova become a federal state made up of three republics: Moldova, Gagauzia, and Transnistria.

In 1994, the Parliament of Moldova awarded to "the people of Gagauzia" (through the adoption of the new Constitution of Moldova) the right of "external self-determination". On 23 December 1994, the Parliament of the Republic of Moldova accepted the "Law on the Special Legal Status of Gagauzia" (Gagauz: Gagauz Yeri), resolving the dispute peacefully. This date is now a Gagauz holiday. Gagauzia is now a "national-territorial autonomous unit" with three official languages: Romanian, Gagauz, and Russian.

Communes with over 50% ethnic Gagauz held referendums where a simple majority was required to join the autonomous region. Communes with fewer Gagauz could have referendums if they were requested by one-third of the population. Following the 5 March 1995 referendum, three towns and 26 communes were included in the Autonomous Gagauz Territory. Gheorghe Tabunșcic was elected to serve as the Governor (Romanian: Guvernator, Gagauz: Başkan) of Gagauzia for a four-year term, as were the deputies of the local parliament, "The People's Assembly" (Gagauz: "Halk Topluşu"), with Petr Pașalî as chairman.

Dmitrii Croitor won the 1999 governor elections and began to assert the rights granted to the governor by the 1994 agreement. The central authorities of Moldova proved unwilling to accept the results, initiating a lengthy stand-off between the autonomy and Chișinău. Finally, Croitor resigned in 2002 due to the pressure from the Moldovan government, which accused him of abuse of authority, relations with the separatist authorities of Transnistria, and other charges.

The central electoral commission of Gagauzia did not register Croitor as a candidate for the post of the Governor in the subsequent elections, and Gheorghe Tabunșcic was elected in what was described as unfair elections. Mihail Formuzal served as the Governor of Gagauzia from 2006 until 2015. That year Irina Vlah was elected to the position, with 51% of the vote.

On 2 February 2014, Gagauzia held a referendum. An overwhelming majority of voters opted for closer ties with Russia over EU integration. They also said they preferred the independence of Gagauzia if Moldova chooses to enter the EU.

On 23 March 2015, Irina Vlah was elected as the new governor after a strongly pro-Russian campaign, dominated by the quest for closer ties with the Russian Federation.

Geography 
Gagauzia is divided into three districts. It is also split into four enclaves. The main, central enclave includes the cities Comrat and Ceadîr-Lunga and is divided into two districts with those cities serving as administrative centers. The second largest enclave is located around the city of Vulcănești, while two smaller enclaves are the villages of Copceac and Carbalia. The village of Carbalia falls under administration of Vulcănești, while Copceac is part of the Ceadîr-Lunga district.

Administrative divisions 
Gagauzia consists of one municipality, two cities, and 23 communes containing a total of 32 localities.

Politics 
The autonomy of Gagauzia is guaranteed by the Moldovan constitution and regulated by the 1994 Gagauz Autonomy Act. If Moldova decided to unite with Romania, Gagauzia would have the right of self-determination. The Gagauz People's Assembly (Gagauz: Halk Topluşu; Romanian: Adunarea Populară) has a mandate for lawmaking powers within its own jurisdiction. This includes laws on education, culture, local development, budgetary and taxation issues, social security, and questions of territorial administration. The People's Assembly also has two special powers: it may participate in the formulation of Moldova's internal and foreign policy; and, should central regulations interfere with the jurisdiction of Gagauz-Yeri, it has the right of appeal to Moldova's Constitutional Court.

The highest official of Gagauzia, who heads the executive power structure, is the Governor of Gagauzia (Gagauz: Başkan; Romanian: Guvernatorul Găgăuziei). She/he is elected by popular suffrage for a four-year term, and has power over all public administrative bodies of Gagauzia. She/he is also a member of the Government of the Republic of Moldova. Eligibility for governorship requires fluency in the Gagauz language, Moldovan citizenship, and a minimum age of 35 years.

Permanent executive power in Gagauz Yeri is exercised by the Executive Committee (Bakannik Komiteti / Comitetul Executiv). Its members are appointed by the Governor, or by a simple majority vote in the Assembly at its first session. The Committee ensures the application of the laws of the Republic of Moldova and those of the Assembly of Gagauz-Yeri.

As part of its autonomy, Gagauzia has its own police force.

Gagauz Halkı is a former Gagauz separatist political party, now outlawed.

Elections
Elections for the local governor and parliament as well as referendums take place in the autonomous region.

The population also votes in the national legislatives elections.

Economy 
The base of Gagauzia's economy is agriculture, particularly viticulture. The main export products are wine, sunflower oil, non-alcoholic beverages, wool, leather, and textiles. There are 12 wineries, processing more than 400,000 tonnes annually. There are also two oil factories, two carpet factories, one meat factory, and one non-alcoholic beverage factory.

Transport 

Demographics 
According to the 2014 census, Gagauzia had a population of 134,132, of which 36.2% urban and 63.8% rural population.

Births (2010): 2,042 (12.7 per 1,000)
Deaths (2010): 1,868 (11.6 per 1,000)
Growth Rate (2010): 174 (1.1 per 1,000)

Ethnic composition
According to the 2014 census results, the ethnic breakdown in Gagauzia was:

There is an ongoing identity controversy over whether Romanians and Moldovans are the same ethnic group. At the census, every citizen could only declare one nationality; consequently, one could not declare oneself both Moldovan and Romanian.

Religion
Christians – 96.0%
Orthodox Christians – 93.0%
Protestant – 3.0%
Baptists – 1.6%
Seventh-day Adventists – 0.8%
Evangelicals – 0.4%
Pentecostals – 0.2%
Other – 2.2%
No Religion – 1.6%
Atheists – 0.2%

Culture and education 
Gagauzia has 55 schools, the Comrat Pedagogical College (high school plus two years over high school), and Comrat State University (Komrat Devlet Universiteti ). Turkey financed the creation of a Turkish cultural centre (Türk İşbirliği Ve Kalkınma İdaresi Başkanlığı) and a Turkish library (Atatürk Kütüphanesi). In the village of Beșalma, there is a Gagauz historical and ethnographical museum established by Dimitriy Kara Çöban.

Despite declaring Gagauz as the national language of the autonomous region, the local authorities do not provide any full Gagauz-teaching school, most of those are Russian-language as opposed to inner Moldovan full Romanian language education. Although pupils are introduced to all of the usual school languages (Russian, Romanian, English or French, Gagauz), the local language continues to be the most popular language.

Sport 
Not being a sovereign nation, Gagauzia's Football team cannot be admitted to FIFA. However, in 2006 Gagauzia did participate in the ELF Cup, held in North Cyprus, where it competed with teams from other regions around the world which fall short of full national sovereignty.

Gagauzia has various football clubs. FC Olimp Comrat and Univer-Oguzsport are based in Comrat and FC Saxan Gagauz Yeri is based in Ceadîr-Lunga and they play their matches in Ceadîr-Lunga Stadium.

See also 

 Gagauz people
 FC Olimp Comrat
 List of Chairmen of the Gagauzian People's Assembly

Notes

References

Further reading

External links 

 

 
Territorial units of Moldova
States and territories established in 1994
Autonomous regions
Members of the Unrepresented Nations and Peoples Organization
Post-Soviet states
Romanian-speaking countries and territories
Russian-speaking countries and territories
Regions of Europe with multiple official languages
1994 establishments in Moldova
Observer members of the International Organization of Turkic Culture